Quri Pukara (Quechua quri gold, pukara fortress, "gold fortress", Hispanicized spelling Jori Pucara) is a  mountain in the Andes of Peru. It is situated in the Cusco Region, Quispicanchi Province, Marcapata District. Quri Pukara lies south of Wisk'achani.

References 

Mountains of Cusco Region
Mountains of Peru